Jahan-e-Khalid is Pakistani super model, educationist and entrepreneur. Having worked with top brands and fashion designers he has established himself as a leading model and has been nominated twice as Best Model Male at Lux Style Awards. He received three consecutive nominations at Hum Awards as Best Model Male, winning one.

Career
Khalid was born on April 24, 1986 in Lahore. He attended Aitchison College and completed his bachelor's degree in Association of Chartered Certified Accountants (ACCA) in 2010 and worked for two years before entering the fashion industry. Besides modeling he helped his father's construction business.

In 2009 while working at call center he did a photoshoot with his friend, who wanted to be professional photographer, he recalled "The portfolio turned out really well and he sent those out to different designers. We became a team. We supported each other. In the time span of 6 months, he found Tariq Amin (the awesome hair and makeup artist of Pakistan) and he introduced me to him. From there my journey began." In 2012 he officially joined the industry and modeled for Republic by Omar Farooq and since then worked with HSY, Deepak Perwani, Emraan Rajput and many others. He regularly appears in Pakistan Fashion Design Council's fashion weeks, events and seminars.

Awards and nominations

References

External links
 
  (Fan page, run by himself)

Living people
1986 births
People from Lahore
Pakistani male models
Aitchison College alumni